Coldwater River Provincial Park is a provincial park in British Columbia, Canada, located at the confluence of the Coldwater River with Cullet Creek, 50 km south of Merritt on BC Highway 5.

References

BC Parks webpage

Provincial parks of British Columbia
Canadian Cascades
Nicola Country
1986 establishments in British Columbia
Protected areas established in 1986